Küntzel may refer to:
Marco Küntzel, German soccer player
Matthias Küntzel, German political scientist
Karl-Friedrich Künzel, a German Schnellboot commander in World War II
Tobias Künzel, a German Pop artist and composer
Claudia Nystad (née Künzel), a German cross country skier
Erich Kunzel, American orchestra conductor
Brandy Kuentzel, American corporate attorney and businesswoman